The 1983 Copa Libertadores de América Finals was the final two-legged tie to determine the Copa Libertadores de América champion. It was contested by Brazilian club Grêmio and Uruguayan club Peñarol. The first leg of the tie was played on 22 July at Estadio Centenario in Montevideo, with the second leg played on 28 July at Estádio Olímpico Monumental in Porto Alegre.

With the first game tied 1-1, Grêmio were crowned champions after winning the second leg 2–1.

Qualified teams

Format
The finals was played over two legs; home and away. The team that accumulated the most points —two for a win, one for a draw, zero for a loss— after the two legs was crowned champion. If the two teams were tied on points after the second leg, a playoff in a neutral would become the next tie-breaker. Goal difference was used as a last resort.

Match details

First leg

Second leg

References

1983 in South American football
Copa Libertadores Finals
Peñarol matches
Grêmio Foot-Ball Porto Alegrense matches
Football in Uruguay
Football in Brazil